Prinsesa ng Banyera (International title: Fish Port Princess / ) is a 2007 Philippine weekday daytime soap opera of ABS-CBN's Hapontastic afternoon block, from October 8, 2007 to May 23, 2008 which aired after Wowowee. It stars Kristine Hermosa and Angelika Dela Cruz with TJ Trinidad, Rafael Rosell and Ara Mina. It ruled the afternoon programming and was also shown worldwide through The Filipino Channel weekdays and its affiliate S+A, and Saturdays as a 5-episode marathon.

The TV series also aired in Malaysia via TV3 (Malaysia) weekdays in 2010.

The series was streaming online on YouTube.

Production 
The TV series marked Kristine Hermosa's comeback to television drama and her first daytime telenovela for the network. This marked her second pairing with her successful team up with actor TJ Trinidad after Gulong ng Palad. The series was also a planned primetime project. The series was also delayed one week internationally but aired the entire first week on its Saturday afternoon block on The Filipino Channel (TFC). The series received well with mixed reviews because it used formulas from Mexican and Filipino storylines. This also served a comeback for 80's model and actress Lyka Ugarte in her acting career. The series was moved to 2:45 pm after timeslot issues. This marked Angelika Dela Cruz's second television rivalry with Kristine Hermosa after the 2003-2004 internationally acclaimed drama Sana'y Wala Nang Wakas after Angelika Dela Cruz departed from her home network. In late 2007, Ara Mina and Oyo Sotto from GMA 7 transferred to the network as regulars and successfully raised ratings.

Plot

Prinsesa Ng Banyera is an afternoon soap opera ABS-CBN and became the first afternoon drama with a primetime storyline.

Maningning (Kristine Hermosa) grew up living with her younger brother under the cruelty of her mother Virgie (Jaclyn Jose) because of love. However, Virgie blames Maningning for the misfortunes throughout her life.

The story revolves around the fish market, and the real lives of people in the society where men rule the ports. While Maningning has hopes of finding her sister Mayumi, the latter managed to trace their biological father (Allan Paule), who is married to the scheming Eleanor (Lyka Ugarte). 14 years later upon visiting her hometown in Batangas, Mayumi (Angelika Dela Cruz) recognizes her twin sister and mother who do not notice her at first. Now living the life she ever wanted as Daphne Pertierra, Mayumi does not know that her true identity will come back to haunt her as Maningning is first hired as a laundry woman for the Perrei household, then eventually as a caretaker for the Pertierra matriarch Consuelo. As Maningning hides the truth about her work and studies to give her brother Habagat a good life, and saving money for his further education, this dismays Daphne. Daphne’s fiancé Charles (Rafael Rosell) will take a certain like to Maningning; to make matters worse, Charles' mother does not accept her for her son. So, Daphne has plans to ruin Maningning and as time begins to run out, Maningning finds out Daphne's real identity. 

Their last remembrance together now is at their home in the pier as they reunite but someone ends up shooting Daphne unknowingly. Maningning is blamed for her twin sister’s demise by Eleanor. A new woman named Cassandra Ynarez (Ara Mina) arrives, and ends up causing harm in Maningning's life.

Cast and characters

Main cast

Supporting cast 
Oyo Boy Sotto as Victor Abad
Andi Eigenmann as Sandy
Stella Cañete as Myrna Fragante
Neil Ryan Sese as Harry Medina
Frances Makil-Ignacio as Mayor Violeta Villar
Chokoleit as Chita
Ketchup Eusebio as Conrad “Bukol” Okoy
Micah Muñoz as Ferpecto “Octopus” Castillo
Ping Medina as Armand Arellano
Maricar de Mesa as Lilibeth
Lyka Ugarte as Eleanor Guevarra-Pertierra
Mark  Denzel Delgado as Bryan Fragante
Lance Jericho Reblando as Pusit Castillo
Micah Roi Torre as Ula
Isabel Blaesi
 Cherry Cosio
 Madeleine Nicolas

Special participation 
Nonie Buencamino as Joel Burgos†
Denise Laurel as teen Virgie
Ira Eigenmann as teen Rosa
Joem Bascon as teen Sigmund
Joseph Bitangcol as teen Harry
Jeremiah Rosales as teen Joel
Jane Oineza as young Maningning
Kathryn Bernardo as young Mayumi/Daphne
Kristofer Martin Dangculos as young Eric
Kyle Balili as young Bukol
Basty Alcances as young Octopus
Fraz Yap as Young Charles
Karlos Buted as young Armand
Arlene Sebastian as Rosanna
Jill Paragas as Antonia
Relleyson Salazar as Goku
Danielle Thomas P. Velasco as Pooker

Production notes
Director: Andoy Ranay, Rechie Del Carmen
Business Unit Head: Enrico Santos
Production Manager: Rizza Ebriega
Executive Producer: Ellen Criste
Creative Manager: Jake Tordesillas
Headwriter: Keiko Aquino
Writers: Lobert Villela, Genesis Rodriguez, Bridgette Ann Rebuca, Jerik de Guzman, Rizalino Pinlac

Trivia
This is Kristine Hermosa's second soap with TJ Trinidad after their very successful soap opera Gulong ng Palad back in 2006.
Both of the lead stars were former girlfriends of Jericho Rosales.
Andi Eigenmann (who played Sandy) is Jaclyn Jose's daughter in real life and this is her first Teleserye before being the lead in 2010 TV series Agua Bendita on ABS-CBN.
This is Angelika Dela Cruz and Kristine Hermosa's reunion series after their hit Sana'y Wala Nang Wakas.
This was Angelika de la Cruz's last TV series on ABS-CBN before she transferred to GMA 7.
Due to Angelika de la Cruz's departure from ABS-CBN to GMA 7, Ara Mina replaced her. Also added is Oyo Sotto. Both stars are from GMA 7 transferred to ABS-CBN.
This became an ABS-CBN's highest-rated daytime television series that ran for 9 months straight and the first Rivalry and casting for Kristine Hermosa and Ara Mina.
ABS-CBN adapted the soap to have a characteristic to fairy tales but set in much of a different world Pinoy style in the gamble outskirts of poverty markets and in gambling world where there is only one princess and who is the real heiress after Angelika de la Cruz's character Mayumi/Daphne's death in a different world where men rule the courtyards and woman were just housewives.
This television series began rumors of Kristine Hermosa and Oyo Boy Sotto seeing each other and became eventually true.
The court case between Kristine Hermosa's character that she killed her sister (which was not true) had to have an advisory by ABS-CBN because of its fictional yet real-life situation.
Conflict on the set sparked between Past Resident Director Andoy Ranay and Kristine Hermosa sparked news on each sides, and was mostly the biggest news on television and showbiz magazine variety talk shows on its run.
This was the second teleserye that Angelika Dela Cruz's character was killed due to transfer of the rival network GMA. The first teleserye was Esperanza (she transferred in GMA in 1999 and back to ABS in year 2003).

External links
 Prinsesa ng Banyera to air finale next week 
 Prinsesa ng Banyera: Ikatlong Aklat
 Prinsesa ng Banyera Prinsesa ng Banyera Drama

See also
List of shows previously aired by ABS-CBN

References

ABS-CBN drama series
2007 Philippine television series debuts
2008 Philippine television series endings
Filipino-language television shows
Television shows set in Manila